Kiss Me (French: Embrassez-moi) is a 1932 French comedy film directed by Léon Mathot and starring Georges Milton, Abel Tarride and Tania Fédor.

Cast
 Georges Milton as Boucatel  
 Abel Tarride as Le marquis de Champavert  
 Tania Fédor as Aurore de Champavert  
 Jeanne Helbling as La comtesse  
 Maurice Escande as Gaston 
 Raymonde Bonnet as Géraldine 
 Odette Valensay as Émérantine  
 Sinoël as Leclerc  
 Georges Tréville as Lord Ashwell  
 Albert Beauval as Le vicomte  
 Bazin as Norbert  
 Julien Clément as Joseph

See also
 Kiss Me (1929)

References

Bibliography 
 Crisp, Colin. Genre, Myth and Convention in the French Cinema, 1929-1939. Indiana University Press, 2002.

External links 
 

1932 films
1932 comedy films
French comedy films
1930s French-language films
Films directed by Léon Mathot
Remakes of French films
Sound film remakes of silent films
French films based on plays
French black-and-white films
1930s French films